Yashmakia is a genus of moths in the family Geometridae described by Warren in 1901.

Species
Yashmakia vanbraeckeli Debauch, 1941 Sulawesi
Yashmakia purpurascens (Warren, 1894) Ichang
Yashmakia medionubis (Prout, 1925) north-eastern Himalayas
Yashmakia suffusa (Warren, 1893) north-eastern Himalayas
Yashmakia erythra (Hampson, 1891) southern India
Yashmakia conflagrata (Hampson, 1912) southern India
Yashmakia submissa (Warren, 1894) north-eastern Himalayas
Yashmakia veneris Warren, 1901 Borneo, Sumatra
Yashmakia loxozyga Holloway, 1993 Borneo, Sulawesi
Yashmakia orsinephes (Prout, 1928) Sumatra, Borneo
Yashmakia bigrisea Holloway, 1993 Borneo, Sumatra, Bali

References

Baptini